Patranque is a rural dish from Auvergne in France made by soaking stale bread in milk and tome fraîche (which is very different from actual tomme cheese: the recipe will fail if tomme cheese is used, since that melts in a very different way) or young Cantal cheese.

Recipe 
Chop the stale bread or cut it into cubes into a hollow dish. Pour the milk over it and let it soak. Cut the Cantal cheese into thin cubes, as finely as possible, and set aside. Drain the bread, then press it into a colander to remove the milk. Heat the butter in a large, thick-bottomed skillet. As soon as it starts foaming, add the bread crumb and stir with a wooden spatula to soak up melted butter. Then add the cheese gradually without ceasing to stir. Continue the operation on medium heat, while the cheese starts to melt. Season with pepper, salt, onions and garlic. Halfway through cooking, the patranque can be turned over like a large patty.

Bibliography

See also
Aligot
Truffade
Auvergne

References
 Dictionnaire Multilingue de la Cuisine française

Notes

French cuisine
Cheese dishes
Auvergne
Auvergne-Rhône-Alpes
Massif Central